Michele Zezza (Naples, 7 April 1850 – 26 June 1927) was a Roman Catholic patriarch and Catholic Archbishop of Naples, Italy.

Biography
Michele Zezza of the Barons of Zapponeta was born in Naples on 7 April 1850 and was ordained a priest on 21 September 1872.

On 1 June 1891 he was appointed auxiliary bishop of Naples and bishop of Calidone. He received the episcopal consecration on 21 June that year.

On 12 June 1893 he was appointed bishop of Pozzuoli. In 1896 he established, at the church of San Raffaele di Pozzuoli, the diocesan center of the apostolate of prayer and the watchdog association in honor of the Sacred Heart of Jesus.

On 3 July 1919 he was promoted to Archbishop Coadjutor, with the right of succession, of Naples and archbishop of Ancira. He was Archbishop of Naples from 4 April 1923 to 20 December 1923, the day of nomination to Patriarch of Constantinople.

He died on 26 June 1927.

See also
Catholic Church in Italy

References

20th-century Italian Roman Catholic archbishops